Quetzalpetlatl Corona is a corona in Lada Terra on the planet Venus. Latitude 68° South, Longitude 357° East. It has a diameter of 780 kilometers, and is the 4th largest corona on Venus. It lies in part on the Lada Rise, with part of the corona intersecting the Ammavuro-Quetzalpetlatl belt in the northwestern region of Lada Terra.

It is named for Quetzalpetlatl an Aztec fertility goddess. 

Surface features of Venus